James Charles Corman (October 20, 1920 – December 30, 2000) was an American politician who served as a member of the Los Angeles City Council from 1957 to 1961 and as a member of the United States House of Representatives between 1961 and 1981.

Early life and education
Corman was born on October 20, 1920, in Galena, Kansas, the son of Ransford D. Corman and Edna V. Corman, both of Kansas. His father was a silica miner who died of lung disease brought on by his work. Young James was brought to California by his mother in 1933; he attended Belmont High School in Los Angeles and earned a Bachelor of Arts degree from University of California, Los Angeles and a law degree from the USC Gould School of Law.

Military

Corman was a cadet officer at UCLA with the Reserve Officer Training Corps, and he was made a second lieutenant in the U.S. Marine Corps in June 1943.

In 1944, he told of the death of a Japanese soldier he witnessed in the Mariana Islands while his Marine unit was guarding a food supply. The Marines held their fire until the Japanese "began pawing over the [food] in the darkness, and then opened fire." One Japanese "fell wounded over a crate of salmon cans. His companions fled." Corman continued:

Suddenly we heard the tap of a grenade. We ducked into our foxholes just before the explosion and were unhurt. In the morning we found the Jap had decapitated himself. In his wallet was a magazine clipping of a picture of Japanese-American soldiers fighting with United States forces in Italy.

Career

City Council

In 1957 Corman, supported by labor and Democratic votes, was elected to a four-year term represent Los Angeles City Council District 7, over Kay Bogendorfer, a Republican. In that year, this newly established San Fernando Valley district was bounded on the south by Riverside Drive on the east by Coldwater Canyon and Woodman avenues and on the west generally by Balboa Boulevard. It had been moved from Downtown Los Angeles after Councilman Don A. Allen was elected to the State Assembly. Corman did not finish his term, being elected to Congress in 1960.

Congress

"In with President Kennedy and out with President Carter," he would say after he left the United States Congress. He served in the House of Representatives from 1961 to 1981. Corman served as the chair of the Democratic Congressional Campaign Committee from 1976 to 1981. Until Sean Patrick Maloney’s defeat in 2022, Corman was the most recent chairman of the DCCC to lose re-election.

In 1980, Corman was narrowly defeated for re-election by Los Angeles School Board member Bobbi Fiedler.

Later career

After his Congressional service, he opened a lobbying firm, Corman Law Offices, in Washington, D.C., with a partner, William Kirk. Their clients included MCA Inc., American Newspaper Publishers Association and National Structured Settlements Trade Association. The firm merged with Silverstein & Mullens in January 1990. Corman represented Texas Air Corporation president Frank Lorenzo in his contested takeover of Continental Airlines. He stopped representing the National Committee to Preserve Social Security and Medicare because of its "high-pressure fund-raising methods and alarmist pronouncements."

In 1985 he was elected president of Americans United for Separation of Church and State.

Personal life 
A Methodist, he was married on June 22, 1946, to Virginia Little of Atlanta, Georgia. They had two children, Mary Ann and James C., Jr.

He was said to be "extremely bright, intensely private and sometimes moody" as well as "a courtly man in a tumultuous time ... with old-fashioned graciousness." At age 68, he was described as a "dapper in monogrammed shirts, leather suspenders and wing-tipped shoes."

Corman died at age 80 on December 30, 2000, after suffering a stroke in a rehabilitation facility in Arlington, Virginia. He was survived by his fourth wife, Nancy Breetwor-Malone. They had two children, Adam and Brian. A funeral service was held in Arlington National Cemetery, and interment followed.

Legacy

In 2001, the Van Nuys Federal Building was named in his honor. He was portrayed by Stoney Westmoreland in the 2016 film All the Way. The James C. Corman papers are held in the University Library at California State University, Northridge.

References

External links
Congressional Biographical Directory
Arlington National Cemetery

1920 births
2000 deaths
Belmont High School (Los Angeles) alumni
Democratic Party members of the United States House of Representatives from California
Los Angeles City Council members
University of California, Los Angeles alumni
Burials at Arlington National Cemetery
USC Gould School of Law alumni
20th-century American politicians
People from Galena, Kansas
United States Marine Corps personnel of World War II